Al-Khor Sports Club is a Qatari professional sports club based in Al Khor, featuring teams in a number of sports including football, futsal, basketball, volleyball, handball, athletics, table tennis and swimming. It is best known for its football team which competes in the Qatar Stars League. It plays its home games at Al Khor Stadium.

History

Foundation

Al-Khor was unofficially established in 1951 by oil workers to fulfill them with the appropriate facility to invest their energy after their participation with the multinational oil companies at the time. In 1961, the club was re-established and set football as its main sport, along with other sports and activities. There were two other clubs in Al Khor, but none of the clubs cooperated. In 1962, Al-Khor SC merged with Al-Jeel Sports Club, one of the other clubs.

In 1964, they conglomerated with Nahdi Al-Aswad (transliterated to "Black Sports Club") and had formally made a request to join the Qatar Football Association on 10 June later that year. From then on, the club was known as Al-Taawun.

Post-merger (1964–2004)
The club took advantage of the youth movement and was provided with funds for all facilities. He designed plans and programs to increase the number of participants in the majority of sports. Since 1961, yellow and white were the club colors. In 1964 the club entered the football league and changed the colors to blue and white. Currently, all three colors are included in the crest.

Renaming to Al Khor (2004–present)
In 2004, the club name was changed to Al Khor after the Qatar Olympic Committee had ordered the name change to clarify the location of the club.

Honors
Qatar Crown Prince Cup
 Winners (1): 2005

Qatar Sheikh Jassem Cup
 Winners (1): 2002

Qatari 2nd Division:
 Winners (1): 1983

Asian record

Q = Qualification
GS = Group stage
R16 = Round of 16
QF = Quarter-final
SF = Semi-final

GCC Champions League

Individual honours
2009 FIFA Confederations Cup:
The following players have played in the FIFA Confederations Cup whilst playing for Al Khor:
 2009 – Alaa Abdul-Zahra
 2009 – Mahdi Karim
 2009 – Salam Shakir

Performance in UAFA competitions
Arabian Gulf Club Champions Cup: 3 appearances
2008: Group stage
2010: Group stage
2011: Semi-finals
2012: Semi-finals

Players
As of Qatar Stars League:

Personnel

Current technical staff
Last update: September 2021

Presidential history
From 1963 to 1982.

Managerial history
Last update: May 2021

 Ronald Douglas (ca.) (1979)
 Marcos Falopa (1979–80)
 Mohammed Mubarak Al Mohannadi (1980)
 Marcos Falopa (1980–82)
 Alcides Romano Junior (1987–89)
 Antal Szentmihályi (1991–92)
 Szapor Gábor (1993–94)
 Bosse Nilsson (1995)
 Mowaffaq Mawla (1997–98)
 Alcides Romano Junior (1998)
 Roberto Carlos (1998–99)
 José Roberto Ávila (1999–00)
 Paulo Henrique (2000–01)
 João Francisco (2001–02)
 Ladislas Lozano (1 July 2002 – 30 June 2003)
 René Simões (2003)
 Robert Mullier (2003–04)
 René Exbrayat (2004–06)
 Jean-Paul Rabier (1 July 2006 – 30 June 2008)
 Ladislas Lozano (ca.) (Nov 2007)
 Bertrand Marchand (1 July 2008 – 14 June 2010)
 Alain Perrin (14 June 2010 – 31 May 2012)
 László Bölöni (24 June 2012–15)
 Jean Fernandez (2015–2017)
 Laurent Banide (2017–2018)
 Adel Sellimi (1 July 2018 – 15 September 2018)
 Omar Najhi (2018)
 Bernard Casoni (25 September 2018 – June 30, 2019)
 Omar Najhi (1 July 2019 – 30 September 2020)
 Frédéric Hantz (1 October 2020 – 25 December 2020)
 Mostafa Souiheb (26 December 2020 – 24 January 2021)
 Winfried Schafer (25 January 2021 – )

References

External links
Official website

 
Khor
Association football clubs established in 1961
1961 establishments in Qatar